Pool A of the 2010 Women's Rugby World Cup was composed of 2006 World Cup winners New Zealand, Australia, South Africa and Wales.

Australia vs Wales

Touch judges:
Joyce Henry (Canada)
Dana Teagarden (United States)
Fourth official:
Dave Broadwell (England)
Fifth official:
Paula Carter (England)

New Zealand vs South Africa

Touch judges:
Sébastien Minery (France)
Gabriel Lee (Hong Kong)
Fourth official:
Andrea Ttofa (England)
Fifth official:
Rebecca Patrick (England)

South Africa vs Wales

Touch judges:
Andrew McMenemy (Scotland)
Barbara Guastini (Italy)
Fourth official:
Alan Biggs (England)
Fifth official:
Jane Pizii (England)

Australia vs New Zealand

Touch judges:
Kerstin Ljungdahl (Germany)
Debbie Innes (England)
Fourth official:
Ed Turnill (England)
Fifth official:
Catherine Lewis (England)

New Zealand vs Wales

Touch judges:
Sherry Trumbull (Canada)
Kerstin Ljungdahl (Germany)
Fourth official:
Claire Hodnett (England)
Fifth official:
Natalie Amor (England)

Australia vs South Africa

Touch judges:
Sébastien Minery (France)
Barbara Guastini (Italy)
Fourth official:
Natalie Amor (England)
Fifth official:
Moira Pritchard (England)

Pool A
2010–11 in Welsh rugby union
2010 in Australian rugby union
2010 in New Zealand rugby union
2010 in South African rugby union
2010 in Australian women's sport
2010 in New Zealand women's sport
2010 in South African women's sport